Jonquel Orthea Jones (born January 5, 1994) is a Bahamian-Bosnian professional basketball player for the New York Liberty of the Women's National Basketball Association (WNBA). She was drafted with the 6th overall pick in the 2016 WNBA Draft. Since May 2019, she also holds the citizenship of Bosnia and Herzegovina, allowing her to play for the national team.

A 6'6" power forward/center, Jones played college basketball for Clemson and George Washington. After the February 2022 Russian invasion of Ukraine, she left the Russian team UMMC Ekaterinburg, and joined the Turkish team Çukurova Basketbol.

Early life
Jones was born in the Bahamas. She attended Tabernacle Baptist Academy. At age 14, she moved to Maryland, where she attended Riverdale Baptist School. Coach Diane Richardson became her legal guardian. Her nickname in high school was "Big Slim".

WNBA career
In 2016, Jones was acquired by the Connecticut Sun after having her draft rights traded by the Los Angeles Sparks in exchange for Chelsea Gray and two draft picks. In her rookie season, Jones was the backup center for the Sun. She averaged 6.8 ppg, 3.7 rpg and 1.1 bpg in 34 games with 6 starts.

In 2017, Jones became the starting center for the Sun and had a breakout second season. After an 0–4 start, Jones led the Sun to their first win of the season, scoring 23 points along with 21 rebounds in a 97–79 win over the Chicago Sky, making her the 13th player in league history to record a 20-point, 20-rebound performance. On July 8, Jones scored a team-high 22 points and 9 rebounds as the Sun completed the biggest comeback in franchise history, defeating the Washington Mystics 96–92 after overcoming a 22-point deficit. Jones was selected to the 2017 WNBA All-Star Game, her first career All-Star Game appearance. She finished the season averaging a double-double in points and rebounds and also averaged career-highs in scoring, rebounding, and blocks. She broke the single season record for rebounds with 403, breaking Tina Charles previous record of 398 (the record would be broken again by Sylvia Fowles in 2018). Jones was selected to the 2017 WNBA All-Star Game and received the WNBA Most Improved Player Award. Her breakout performance, along with teammates Jasmine Thomas and Alyssa Thomas emerging as All-Stars, led the Sun to the playoffs as the fourth-seeded team. They received a bye to the second-round elimination game, where Jones scored 19 points and grabbed 15 rebounds in an 88–83 loss to the number 5-seeded Phoenix Mercury.

In 2018, Jones would have a reduced role on the team despite her success from last season. She started in 16 of the 34 games played but would still effective for the Sun both in the starting lineup and off the bench. By the end of the season, Jones won the WNBA Sixth Woman of the Year award. The Sun made it back to the playoffs as the number 4 seed with a 21–13 record, receiving a bye to the second round. However the Sun would lose yet again to the Phoenix Mercury in the second round elimination game by a final score of 96–86.

In 2019, Jones would redeem her starting Center role for the whole season. She would lead the league in rebounds once again and averaged a career-high in blocks, steals and minutes by the end of the season. Jones was also voted into the 2019 WNBA All-Star Game, making it her second all-star appearance and would also make WNBA Second Team. The Sun were a championship contender in the league, finishing with a 23–11 record and the number 2 seed, receiving a double bye to the semi-finals. In the semi-finals, the Sun swept the Los Angeles Sparks 3–0 to advance to the WNBA Finals, making it the franchise's first finals appearance since 2005. The WNBA Finals series was a hard-fought battle, but the Sun fell to the Washington Mystics in five games.

In June 2020, Jones announced that she would forgo the WNBA season due to concerns from the coronavirus.

In 2021 Jones returned to the WNBA and had led the Sun to the best record in the league and was averaging a career high in every major statistic before reporting to the FIBA Women's Eurobasket to represent the Bosnian women's national basketball team. When she returned the Sun went back to being the top team in the league and closed out the season with a 14 game winning streak leading to a record of 26–6 and the best record in the league , Jones averaged a career high in points assist with averages of 19.4 points 11.2 rebounds 2.8 assist 1.3 steals 1.3 blocks and was named the 2021 WNBA MVP nearly unanimously, Jones also made WNBA All-Defensive First Team and nearly won DPOY as well. With winning MVP Jones became the first player in WNBA History to win MVP ,  Sixth Women of the Year and WNBA Most Improved Player Award. 

During the offseason prior to the 2023 WNBA season, Jones requested a trade out of Connecticut and was dealt to the New York Liberty in January of 2023.

Overseas career

During the 2016–17 off-season, Jones signed with Asan Woori Bank Wibee of the Women's Korean Basketball League and won a championship with the team. In October 2017, Jones signed with Shanxi Flame of the Women's Chinese Basketball Association for the 2017–18 off-season. 

In August 2018, Jones signed with UMMC Ekaterinburg of the Russian League. After the February 2022 Russian invasion of Ukraine, she left the Russian team.

In 2022, She joined the Turkish team Çukurova Basketbol which participates in the Women's Basketball Super League.

National team career
She made her debut for the national team of Bosnia and Herzegovina at the first round of EuroBasket Women 2021 qualification on 14 November 2019 against Russia. She claimed a mammoth double-double of 29 points and 16 rebounds on what proved to be an agonizing night for Russia coach Alexander Kovalev as he lost his first game at the helm in his hometown of Orenburg.

In a quarter-final loss against France in the EuroBasket Women 2021, she set an all time record for most rebounds in a single EuroBasket game. She finished the game with 29 points and 24 rebounds, beating the previous record of 21 rebounds shared by three players. She was named to the FIBA EuroBasket Women All-Tournament Team.

Personal life
In 2019, Jones got a goldendoodle puppy.

Career statistics

College 
Source

WNBA

Regular season 

|-
| style="text-align:left;"| 2016
| style="text-align:left;"| Connecticut
| 34 || 6 || 14.1 || .531 || .333 || .739 || 3.7 || 0.6 || 0.6 || 1.1 || 0.7 || 6.8
|-
| style="text-align:left;"| 2017
| style="text-align:left;"| Connecticut
| 34|| 34 || 28.5 || .534|| .446 || .818 || bgcolor="EOCEF2" | 11.9  || 1.5 || 0.8 || 1.4 || 1.6 || 15.4
|-
| style="text-align:left;"| 2018
| style="text-align:left;"| Connecticut
| 34|| 16 || 20.5 || .550|| .467 || .671 || 5.5  || 1.7 || 0.4 || 1.2 || 1.6 || 11.8
|-
| style="text-align:left;"| 2019
| style="text-align:left;"| Connecticut
| 34|| 34 || 28.8 || .448 || .309 || .818 || style="background:#D3D3D3"|9.7° || 1.5 || 1.2 || 2.0 || 1.9 || 14.6
|-
| style="text-align:left;"| 2021
| style="text-align:left;"| Connecticut
| 27|| 27 || 31.7 || .515 || .362 || .802 || style="background:#D3D3D3"|11.2° || 2.8 || 1.3 || 1.3 || 2.9 || 19.4
|-
| style="text-align:left;"| 2022
| style="text-align:left;"| Connecticut
| 33|| 32 || 26.4 || .513 || .369 || .802 || 8.6 || 1.8 || 1.1 || 1.2 || 2.6 || 14.6
|-
| style="text-align:left;"| Career
| style="text-align:left;"|6 years, 1 team
| 196 || 149 || 24.8 || .511 || .377 || .787 || 8.3 || 1.6 || 0.9 || 1.4 || 1.9 || 13.6

Playoffs 

|-
| style="text-align:left;"| 2017
| style="text-align:left;"| Connecticut
| 1 || 1 || 39.2 || .385 || .400 || .875|| 15.0 || 2.0 || 0.0|| 0.0 || 1.0 || 19.0
|-
| style="text-align:left;"| 2018
| style="text-align:left;"| Connecticut
| 1 || 1 || 26.2 || .667 || .000 || 1.000 || 7.0 || 7.0 || 0.0|| 0.0 || 0.0 || 13.0
|-
| style="text-align:left;"| 2019
| style="text-align:left;"| Connecticut
| 8 || 8 || 32.5 || .528 || .267 || .767 || 10.4 || 2.0 || 0.6 || 1.5 || 1.8 || 17.9
|-
| style="text-align:left;"| 2021
| style="text-align:left;"| Connecticut
| 4 || 4 || 35.0 || .458 || .444 || .778 || 9.8 || 3.3 || 1.3 || 2.3 || 2.0 || 16.3
|-
| style="text-align:left;"| 2022
| style="text-align:left;"| Connecticut
| 12 || 12 || 27.0 || .507 || .414 || .829 || 8.4 || 2.0 || 0.6 || 1.1 || 2.1 || 14.9
|-
| style="text-align:left;"| Career
| style="text-align:left;"|5 years, 1 team
| 26 || 26 || 30.3 || .505 || .347 || .807 || 9.4 || 2.4 || 0.7 || 1.3 || 1.9 || 16.1

References

External links
 

George Washington Colonials bio

1994 births
Living people
People from Freeport, Bahamas
People from West Grand Bahama
Bahamian women's basketball players
Bosnia and Herzegovina women's basketball players
Bahamian emigrants to Bosnia and Herzegovina
Naturalized citizens of Bosnia and Herzegovina
Bosnia and Herzegovina expatriate basketball people in the United States
Bosnia and Herzegovina expatriate basketball people in Russia
Bosnia and Herzegovina expatriate basketball people in Turkey
Bahamian expatriate basketball people in the United States
Bahamian expatriate basketball people in China
Bahamian expatriate basketball people in Russia
Bahamian expatriate basketball people in Turkey
Centers (basketball)
Clemson Tigers women's basketball players
Connecticut Sun players
George Washington Colonials women's basketball players
LGBT basketball players
Bahamian LGBT people
Lesbian sportswomen
Los Angeles Sparks draft picks
Power forwards (basketball)
Women's National Basketball Association All-Stars
Shanxi Flame players